The Kingdom of Kuku (Kingdom of Koukou) was a Kabyle Berber kingdom. It was established around 1515 CE and ruled by the Ath l-Qadi dynasty until 1632 or 1638 CE. Ahmed ou el Khadi (Ou l-Qadi) is acknowledged as the founder.

References

Berber history
Countries in ancient Africa
1515 establishments in Africa
States and territories disestablished in the 1630s
Berber dynasties